7-Zip is a free and open-source file archiver, a utility used to place groups of files within compressed containers known as "archives". It is developed by Igor Pavlov and was first released in 1999. 7-Zip has its own archive format called 7z, but can read and write several others. 

The program can be used from a Windows graphical user interface that also features shell integration, from a Windows command-line interface as the command 7za.exe, and from POSIX systems as p7zip. Most of the 7-Zip source code is under the LGPL-2.1-or-later license; the unRAR code, however, is under the LGPL-2.1-or-later license with an "unRAR restriction", which states that developers are not permitted to use the code to reverse-engineer the RAR compression algorithm.

Since version 21.01 alpha, preliminary Linux support has been added to the upstream instead of the p7zip project.

Archive formats

7z

By default, 7-Zip creates 7z-format archives with a .7z file extension. Each archive can contain multiple directories and files. As a container format, security or size reduction are achieved by looking for similarities throughout the data using a stacked combination of filters. These can consist of pre-processors, compression algorithms, and encryption filters.

The core 7z compression uses a variety of algorithms, the most common of which are bzip2, PPMd, LZMA2, and LZMA. Developed by Pavlov, LZMA is a relatively new system, making its debut as part of the 7z format. LZMA uses an LZ-based sliding dictionary of up to 3840 MB in size, backed by a range coder.

The native 7z file format is open and modular. File names are stored as Unicode.

In 2011, TopTenReviews found that the 7z compression was at least 17% better than ZIP, and 7-Zip's own site has since 2002 reported that while compression ratio results are very dependent upon the data used for the tests, "Usually, 7-Zip compresses to 7z format 30–70% better than to zip format, and 7-Zip compresses to zip format 2–10% better than most other zip-compatible programs."

The 7z file format specification is distributed with the program's source code, in the "doc" sub-directory.

Others
7-Zip supports a number of other compression and non-compression archive formats (both for packing and unpacking), including ZIP, gzip, bzip2, xz, tar, and WIM. The utility also supports unpacking APM, ar, ARJ, chm, cpio, deb, FLV, JAR, LHA/LZH, LZMA, MSLZ, Office Open XML, onepkg, RAR, RPM, smzip, SWF, XAR, and Z archives and cramfs, DMG, FAT, HFS, ISO, MBR, NTFS, SquashFS, UDF, and VHD disk images. 7-Zip supports the ZIPX format for unpacking only. It has had this support since at least version 9.20, which was released in late 2010.

7-Zip can open some MSI files, allowing access to the meta-files within along with the main contents. Some Microsoft CAB (LZX compression) and NSIS (LZMA) installer formats can be opened. Similarly, some Microsoft executable programs (.EXEs) that are self-extracting archives or otherwise contain archived content (e.g., some setup files) may be opened as archives.

When compressing ZIP or gzip files, 7-Zip uses its own DEFLATE encoder, which may achieve higher compression, but at lower speed, than the more common zlib DEFLATE implementation. The 7-Zip deflate encoder implementation is available separately as part of the AdvanceCOMP suite of tools.

The decompression engine for RAR archives was developed using freely available source code of the unRAR program, which has a licensing restriction against creation of a RAR compressor. 7-Zip v15.06 and later support extraction of files in the RAR5 format. Some backup systems use formats supported by archiving programs such as 7-Zip; e.g., some Android backups are in tar format, and can be extracted by archivers such as 7-Zip.

7-Zip ZS, a port of 7-Zip FM with Zstandard .zst (and other formats) support, is developed by Tino Reichardt.

Modern7z, a Zstandard .zst (and other formats) plugin for 7-Zip FM, is developed by Denis Anisimov (TC4shell).

File manager
7-Zip comes with a file manager along with the standard archiver tools. The file manager has a toolbar with options to create an archive, extract an archive, test an archive to detect errors, copy, move, and delete files, and open a file properties menu exclusive to 7-Zip. The file manager, by default, displays hidden files because it does not follow Windows Explorer's policies. The tabs show name, modification time, original and compressed sizes, attributes, and comments (4DOS descript.ion format).

When going up one directory on the root, all drives, removable or internal appear. Going up again shows a list with four options:
 Computer: loads the drives list
 Documents: loads user's documents, usually at %UserProfile%\My Documents
 Network: loads a list of all network clients connected
 \\.: Same as "Computer" except loads the drives in low-level NTFS access. This results in critical drive files and deleted files still existing on the drive to appear. (NOTE: As of November 2020, access to the active partition in low-level mode is not allowed for currently unknown reasons.)

Features
7-Zip supports:
 32 and 64-bit x86, ARM64 architecture support
 File Manager
 Encryption via the 256-bit AES cipher, which can be enabled for both files and the 7z hierarchy. When the hierarchy is encrypted, users are required to supply a password to see the filenames contained within the archive. WinZip-developed Zip file AES encryption standard is also available in 7-Zip to encrypt ZIP archives with AES 256-bit, but it does not offer filename encryption as in 7z archives.
 Volumes of dynamically variable sizes, allowing use for backups on removable media such as writable CDs and DVDs
 Usability as a basic orthodox file manager when used in dual panel mode
 Multiple-core CPU threading
 Opening EXE files as archives, allowing the decompression of data from inside many "Setup" or "Installer" or "Extract" type programs without having to launch them
 Unpacking archives with corrupted filenames, renaming the files as required
 Create self-extracting single-volume archives
 Command-line interface
 Graphical user interface. The Windows version comes with its own GUI; however, p7zip uses the GUI of the Unix/Linux Archive Manager.
 Calculating checksums in the formats CRC-32, CRC-64, SHA-1, or SHA-256 for files on disk, available either via command line or Explorer's context menu
 Available in 87 languages
 Ability to optionally record creation dates (tc) and last access dates (ta) in archives (in addition to modification dates).

Variants
Two command-line versions are provided: 7z.exe, using external libraries; and a standalone executable 7za.exe, containing built-in modules, but with compression/decompression support limited to 7z, ZIP, gzip, bzip2, Z and tar formats. A 64-bit version is available, with support for large memory maps, leading to faster compression. All versions support multi-threading.

The 7za.exe version of 7-Zip is available for Unix-like operating systems (including Linux, FreeBSD, and macOS), FreeDOS, OpenVMS, AmigaOS 4, and MorphOS under the p7zip project.

Software development kit
7-Zip has a LZMA SDK which was originally dual-licensed under both the GNU LGPL and Common Public License, with an additional special exception for linked binaries. On 2 December 2008, the SDK was placed by Igor Pavlov in the public domain.

Security
On older versions, self-extracting archives were vulnerable to arbitrary code execution through DLL hijacking: they load and run a DLL named UXTheme.dll, if it is in the same folder as the executable file. 7-Zip 16.03 Release notes say that the installer and SFX modules have added protection against DLL preloading attack.

Versions of 7-Zip prior to 18.05 contain an arbitrary code execution vulnerability in the module for extracting files from RAR archives, a vulnerability that was fixed on 30 April 2018.

Reception and usage
Snapfiles.com in 2012 rated 7-Zip 4.5 stars out of 5, noting, "[its] interface and additional features are fairly basic, but the compression ratio is outstanding".

On TechRepublic in 2009, Justin James found the detailed settings for Windows File Manager integration were "appreciated" and called the compression-decompression benchmark utility "neat". And though the archive dialog has settings that "will confound most users", he concluded: "7-Zip fits a nice niche in between the built-in Windows capabilities and the features of the paid products, and it is able to handle a large variety of file formats in the process."

Between 2002 and 2016, 7-Zip was downloaded 410 million times from SourceForge alone.

The software has received awards, In 2007, SourceForge granted it community choice awards for "Technical Design" and for "Best Project". In 2013, Tom's Hardware conducted a compression speed test comparing 7-ZIP, MagicRAR, WinRAR, WinZip; they concluded that 7-ZIP beat out all the others with regards to compression speed, ratio, and size and awarded the software the 2013 Tom's Hardware Elite award.

See also

 Comparison of archive formats
 Comparison of file archivers
 List of archive formats

References

External links

 
 
 7-Zip Portable at PortableApps.com

1999 software
Cross-platform free software
Disk image extractors
File archivers
Free data compression software
Free file managers
Free multilingual software
Free software programmed in C
Free software programmed in C++
Portable software
Software using the LGPL license
Windows compression software